Morpeth School is a comprehensive secondary school situated in Bethnal Green with nearly 1200 pupils.

The current headteacher is Jemima Reilly.

Morpeth's pupils come from a wide range of ethnic backgrounds; over half are from Bangladeshi backgrounds, while one-third are white British.

In 2009 Ofsted highlighted Morpeth as one of twelve outstanding schools serving disadvantaged communities. 
Morpeth specialises in the Arts and Music, but has also gained some fame in junior table tennis, and offers a wide range of extracurricular activities. Its new Performing Arts building opened in October 2007 and was opened by the British film director and producer (and former Morpeth parent), Danny Boyle in May 2008.

History
The school was founded by London County Council in 1910 as a central school with the name Morpeth Street School.  The school was enlarged in 1927 by taking over premises of a primary school in Portman Place. During WWII the school located to Bury St Edmunds in Suffolk.  In the 1960's admission by selection was discontinued and the school became comprehensive. An ex-headteacher of the school, Alasdair Uist Macdonald, was knighted in the 2007 New Year Honours for services to education, with his extensive work on improving the school, by improving teaching skills and achievements by pupils in their SATs and GCSEs results. Under his tenure the school underwent a renaissance; after his arrival Morpeth's results at Key Stages Three and Four improved substantially, a notable example being the 76% A-C GCSE pass rate at the end of the 2006 school year.

Guests
Special guests who have visited Morpeth School have included Tony Blair the British Prime Minister who visited the school during his first month in office. Other guests include the Rt. Hon David Blunkett MP (Education Secretary at the time) who opened the school library. Sir Trevor McDonald opened the
'Portman' building in 1995.

More recently on 18 July 2007, within his first two weeks in power, the new Prime Minister Gordon Brown paid a surprise visit to Morpeth School with the Secretary of State for Children, Schools and Families, Ed Balls, MP, attending the first meeting of the new National Council for Educational Excellence. The council was set up in early July to drive forward the Government's long-term aspirations for children and young people's education.

On 12 June 2008, Morpeth School played host to the Film Club launch. Many prestigious guests turned up to the event, including Emma Thompson and Jason Isaacs. On 19 October 2010, Morpeth School welcomed Ian McKellen who talked about homophobia.

After attending the school end-of-year event in 2013, Church of England clergyman Hugh Rayment-Pickard praised the policy of giving certificates of achievement to all students, instead of holding prize-giving ceremonies to recognise only a small elite, and said that all Church of England schools should do the same. The school does have monthly awards for individuals.

Sixth Form
Morpeth provides a Sixth Form in many subject areas; it opened in September 2009 and used to be in a three-way partnership between Morpeth, Oaklands and Swanlea. The main building is on Cambridge Heath Road, but there are other campuses, including the Wessex Centre at Morpeth.

Projects
Morpeth School offers a wide variety of projects and trips for its students. Through Years 10 and 11, a select group of pupils take part in a space project, in which they get to visit universities and space museums. At the end, a few get the chance to go to America and visit NASA. There is also another project run by The Timberland Company, in which pupils get an insight into the world of retail and how the company helps the environment – there is also a day trip to Paris for all of those involved.

Notable former teachers
The baritone and opera singer, Benjamin Luxon CBE, taught PE and English at Morpeth prior to the start of his singing career in 1962.

Notable former pupils
Notable alumni of Morpeth School include Dr Derek Plumb, an authority on the Lollards and the English Reformation, Cheryl Baker, of Bucks Fizz, and Stephen Bush, a journalist at the New Statesman, and in recent times Ashley Facey, a double paralympian who competed in the Rio 2016 Summer Paralympics and the Tokyo 2020 Summer Paralympics, and Elliot Ferguson-Dillon, a coach at RB Leipzig where he helped them win their first major trophy, the German Cup, in his first season.

Ethnic groups
Morpeth School is located in a part of the East End where there are high numbers of people from many different backgrounds and cultures. Approximately half of all pupils have Bangladeshi heritage, about one third are white British and the remaining pupils are from a wide range of other minority ethnic backgrounds. The number of pupils who speak English as an additional language is quite high. The Ofsted report of 2004, based on the annual school census, showed 50% enrolled were Bangladeshi, 32% White, and 9% Afro Caribbean & mixed race.

Subjects
The school teaches both French and Spanish in Year 7. In Year 8 students with an aptitude will continue learning both languages. The rest will study only one modern foreign language.

The Bengali department is always developing new materials for use at all levels in Bengali, which are made available to pupils from Year 8 to Year 9, or for GCSE. The subject is mainly chosen by Bangladeshi pupils, who mainly speak the Sylheti dialect.

The syllabus is based on those of the Edexcel examination board. Pupils will study the introduction to Business, based on marketing issues, and communications of software. Pupils are assessed on their examinations on line, and by coursework.

Courses and work based on Food, Textiles, Graphics and Resistant Materials.

The drama departments use basic studios with lighting and sounds. Currently it has transferred into a Performing Arts building, with more facilities available. At Key Stage 3, pupils are assessed and graded using the National Curriculum level descriptors as highlighted in the Arts Council's Drama in Schools publication. For GCSE 100 spaces are only available for pupils. The departments visits many workshops and trips for pupils.

Morpeth's music department has been extremely busy over the past few years. Most years, the Concert Band and the choir have been on overseas tours to Paris and Madrid and in February 2008, went to Liverpool. Upcoming trips include Iceland, China and New York. The department, run by Peter Romhany, has three well-equipped classrooms, a computer suite, practice rooms and a recording studio that offers pupils access to a range of high-tech facilities that furthers their understanding and creativity. As part of an annual Globetown Project, Morpeth performs at the Guildhall School of Music and Drama. They have also performed in other prestigious venues such as the Barbican and Claridge's. In May 2008, the music department turned the theatre, in the Performing Arts building, into a jazz club and hosted a jazz concert, joined by the John Bennett Big Band.

This subject is offered to pupils when starting their GCSEs in Year 10 and 11. The department has a dark room, for printing purposes of photographs, and with all necessary equipment needed for developing films and printing.

At KS3 explorers through all religions, then at GCSE first year views Christianity and Islam. And optional second year for Islam, Religion and Society or Christianity.

Currently for GCSE it has taken a new course called Twenty First Century Science since 2007.

Statistics

GCSE
Percentage of Pupils achieving the Level 2 threshold – equivalent to five GCSEs at grades A* to C including English and maths. In comparison with the Local Authority Average and the National Average:

Percentage of pupils achieving A*-C grades in GCSE since 1997. The year 1998 recorded the lowest achievement with only 29% pass-rate, and the year 2006 with the highest at 76% – a gain of 47%.

Key Stage 3
Percentage of pupils who achieved at the National Average level or above, from 2002:

See also
 Education in the United Kingdom
 Education in England
 GCSE
 Tower Hamlets
 Education amongst Bangladeshi pupils

References

Secondary schools in the London Borough of Tower Hamlets
Community schools in the London Borough of Tower Hamlets
Bethnal Green